The Republicans may refer to:

The Republicans (France), a political party
The Republicans (Germany), a political party
The Republicans (Italy), a political organization
The Republicans (Poland), a political party
a number of parties called Republican Party (disambiguation), Republican Union (disambiguation), etc.
adherents to Republicanism, a political ideology
a novel by Adolf Stahr

See also
Republican (disambiguation)